Robert L. Hall (February 8, 1927 – March 16, 2012) was an American anthropologist.

Early years and education
Hall was born in Green Bay, Wisconsin, and his mother and her family were members of the Stockbridge-Munsee Community. He earned a B.A. with highest honors from the University of Wisconsin, Department of Anthropology 1950 and an M.A. in 1951 and received his Ph.D. in 1960. In 1951–1952 he was a Thayer Scholar at Harvard University.

Career
Robert Hall specialized in the ethnohistory, ethnology, and archaeology of the Great Plains and Midwestern United States, the beliefs, rituals, and symbolisms of North American and Mesoamerican indigenous peoples, Mesoamerican calendar systems, and the history of Native American-European contacts.

He was a professor emeritus at the University of Illinois at Chicago in the Department of Anthropology and the adjunct curator emeritus of Plains and Midwestern archaeology and ethnology at the Field Museum in Chicago.

References

1927 births
2012 deaths
20th-century American anthropologists
20th-century Native Americans
Harvard University alumni
Stockbridge–Munsee Community people
Native American anthropologists
People from Green Bay, Wisconsin
University of Wisconsin–Madison College of Letters and Science alumni
University of Illinois Chicago faculty
21st-century Native Americans